Kenneth John Shellito (18 April 1940 – 31 October 2018) was an English footballer and manager who played for Chelsea from 1959–1965, and subsequently managed the club from 1977–1978. He worked in a coaching role for the Asian Football Confederation, based in Kuala Lumpur, before spending his later life in Inanam of Sabah as a permanent resident.

Professional career

Chelsea 
Shellito spent his entire playing career at Chelsea, signing for the club from Chelsea Juniors at the age of 17 and making his professional debut two years later against Nottingham Forest. He featured in Tommy Docherty's re-built Chelsea side of the early 1960s as an attacking full-back, helping the club win promotion from the Second Division in 1962–63. However, as the side began to challenge for honours Shellito suffered a serious knee injury and despite several attempted comebacks, was forced to retire prematurely.

International career 
Shellito made one appearance for England, against Czechoslovakia in 1963.

Managerial career

Chelsea 
Upon his retirement, Shellito joined the Chelsea coaching staff and took charge of the club's youth academy in 1968. In the summer of 1977, he was appointed manager of Chelsea, succeeding his former partner at full-back, Eddie McCreadie. He managed to keep Chelsea in the First Division in 1977–78, but the highlight of his tenure was a shock 4–2 win over reigning European champions Liverpool in the FA Cup. He left the club less than a year later, with the side at the bottom of the First Division and facing relegation.

Cambridge United 
He was later manager of Cambridge United, before becoming a coach in Malaysia.

Personal life 
Shellito is married to a Sabahan native, Jeany Dison and have two daughters. One of the daughter is through his previous marriage in England.

Illness and death 
In late 2018, Shellito was hospitalised at the Queen Elizabeth Hospital, Kota Kinabalu due to lung infection and kidney complications. He was treated by Dr Suren and Dr Shadtha during the hospital stay. Later Shellito was discharged on 30 October to die at his home in Kampung Minintod, Inanam on 31 October.

References

External links 
 Ken Shellito on the Chelsea in America Celebrity Podcast (2009).

1940 births
2018 deaths
English footballers
England international footballers
England under-23 international footballers
Chelsea F.C. players
Chelsea F.C. managers
Cambridge United F.C. managers
Chelsea F.C. non-playing staff
Crystal Palace F.C. non-playing staff
Expatriate football managers in Malaysia
Sabah F.C. (Malaysia) managers
Kuala Lumpur City F.C. managers
English football managers
English Football League players
English Football League representative players
English Football League managers
Association football fullbacks
Footballers from East Ham